The phrase siddha yoga can refer to:

 The Siddha Yoga path, founded by Swami Muktananda.
 the Shaiva Siddhanta yoga tradition
 the Siddhayoga-Tirtha lineage

See also
 Siddha (disambiguation)